The 1990 UEFA European Under-16 Championship was the eighth edition of UEFA's European Under-16 Football Championship. East Germany hosted the championship, during 17–27 May 1990. 16 teams entered the competition, and Czechoslovakia won their first title.

Squads

Qualifying

Participants

Results

First stage

Group A

Group B

Group C

Group D

Semi-finals

Third place match

Final

References

RSSSF.com
UEFA.com

1990
UEFA
Under
1990
May 1990 sports events in Europe
1990 in youth association football